This page lists the results of leadership elections held by the New Brunswick Liberal Association.  Before 1930 leaders were chosen by the caucus.

1930 leadership convention

(Held April 23, 1930)

Wendell P. Jones acclaimed

Jones was defeated in the 1930 general election and resigned. Allison Dysart remained House leader.

1932 leadership convention

(Held October 5, 1932)

Allison Dysart elected
John B. McNair
(Note: the vote totals do not appear to have been released. Dysart won by a large majority)

Developments 1932-1954

Dysart resigned as premier in 1940. He was succeeded by McNair on March 13 of that year. Following McNair's personal defeat in the 1952 general election which also swept the Liberals from power he resigned and Austin Claude Taylor was chosen House leader.

1954 leadership convention

(Held on October 16, 1954)

Austin Claude Taylor acclaimed

Taylor resigned when he was appointed to the Senate on January 3, 1957. Joseph E. Connolly was chosen House leader.

1958 leadership convention

(Held on October 11, 1958)

First Ballot:
Louis Robichaud 239
A. Wesley Stuart 208
Joseph E. Connolly 176
George T. Urquhart 87
T.E. Duffie 61
Henry J. Murphy 53
Howard Hicks 1

Second Ballot (Hicks eliminated. Murphy, Duffie and Urquhart withdrew):
Louis Robichaud 403
A. Wesley Stuart 278
Joseph E. Connolly 151

Third Ballot (Connolly eliminated):
Louis Robichaud 517
A. Wesley Stuart 304

1971 leadership convention

(Held October 16, 1971)

First Ballot:
Robert Higgins 737
John G. Bryden 575
Norbert Theriault 289
H. H. Williamson 89
Maurice Harquail 21

Second Ballot (Harquail eliminated. Williamson and Theriault withdrew):
Robert Higgins 986
John G. Bryden 683

1978 leadership convention

(Held May 6, 1978)

First Ballot:
Joseph Daigle 700
John G. Bryden 647
Doug Young 432
John Mooney 309
Herb Breau 225
Robert McCready 100

Second Ballot (McCready eliminated. Breau and Mooney withdrew):
Joseph Daigle 1,042
John G. Bryden 775
Doug Young 565

Third Ballot (Young eliminated):
Joseph Daigle 1,363
John G. Bryden 899

Daigle resigned due to a caucus revolt on November 19, 1981. Doug Young was chosen interim leader.

1982 leadership convention

(Held on February 27, 1982)

Doug Young 1,324
Joseph A. Day 811
Ray Frenette 308
Allan E. Maher 160

1985 leadership convention

(Held May 4, 1985)

Frank McKenna 1,901
Ray Frenette 847

1998 leadership convention

(Held May 2, 1998)

Camille Theriault 2.095
Greg Byrne 1,005
Bernard Richard 666

2002 leadership convention

(Held May 11, 2002)

Shawn Graham 1,349
Jack MacDougall 461

2012 leadership convention

(Held October 27, 2012 in Moncton)

2019 leadership convention

(Scheduled for June 22, 2019 in Saint John, cancelled due to acclamation)

Kevin Vickers (acclaimed)

2022 leadership convention

(Held August 6, 2022 in Fredericton)

First Ballot % of points
T. J. Harvey 33.9% 
Susan Holt 32.12%
Robert Gauvin 19.76%
Donald Arseneault 14.22%
Aresenault eliminated
Second Ballot % of points
T. J. Harvey 39.58%
Susan Holt 36.76% 
Robert Gauvin 23.67%
Gauvin eliminated

Third Ballot % of points
Susan Holt 51.67%
T. J. Harvey 48.33%
Holt elected

References

Carty, Kenneth R, et al., Leaders and Parties in Canadian Politics: Experiences of the Provinces. Harcourt Brace Jovanovich Canada, 1992.
Stanley, Della ] M.M., Louis Robichaud: a Decade of Power. Nimbus, 1984.
Stewart, Ian and Stewart, David K. Conventional choices: Maritime leadership politics. University of British Columbia Press, 2007.
Canadian Annual Review 1930-31